Work Without End: Abandoning Shorter Hours for the Right to Work is a 1988 book by Benjamin Kline Hunnicutt on the rise and decline of American leisure time.

Bibliography

External links 

 
 

1988 non-fiction books
English-language books
Books by Benjamin Kline Hunnicutt
Temple University Press books